Bibidi Babidi Boo is a live internet-only 2004 album released by Deerhoof.

Track listing
"Dog on the Sidewalk" - 1:05
"Dummy Discards a Heart" - 2:27
"All Rise" - 1:13
"Milking" - 4:00
"Giga Dance" - 1:54
"Wicca Wind" - 2:30
"Flower" - 1:31
"Satan" - 1:44
"Desapareceré" - 3:26
"Rainbow Silhouette" - 1:42
"The Forbidden Fruits" - 2:06
"Panda Panda Panda" - 2:54

Personnel

 Chris Cohen – guitar
 John Dieterich – guitar
 Satomi Matsuzaki – bass guitar, vocals
 Greg Saunier – drums, vocals

References

2004 albums
Deerhoof albums